Vilayet Arshtkhoy, Vilayet Arshty, Arshtinskiy Vilayet — Ingush administrative unit of the North Caucasian Imamate. The Naibstvo was the farthest region of the Imamate in the west and it was established on the territory of Orstkhoy society with the center being the village of Arshty.

Etymology 
The name Vilayet Arshtkhoy derives from the Arabic Wilaya and the self-name of Orstkhoy — Arshtkhoy.

History 
Vilayet Arshtkhoy which was known in the Russian Empire as Arshtinskoe Naibstvo, was established in March 1840 on the territory of Orstkhoy with the center of it being the village of Arshty, when the Karabulak (Orstkhoy) and Galashian societies joined the uprising of Chechnya and with their deputies together with Chechens solemnly swore allegiance to Imam Shamil in the large center village of Lesser Chechnya, Urus-Martan.

In 1851 the Vilayet was disestablished when it was conquered by Russian Empire.

Naibs 
 Muhammad-Mirza Anzorov

References

Bibliography 
 
 

History of Ingushetia